The Brunswick Brick Tile & Pottery Company was established in 1870 on a 12-acre paddock on Albert Street Brunswick, as one of the first modern mechanical brickworks in Australia. It was also known as the Hoffman Patent Brick & Tile Company, Hoffman Brickworks, or just ' Hoffman's' for most of its 100 plus years of operation.

The Hoffman brickworks was founded by Jenkin Collier and James McKenzie with Messrs Barry Owen and Rourke. Initially it employed Pratt brick presses, and constructed Hoffman patent continuous firing kilns, developed by Friedreich Hoffman in Stettin, Prussia in 1859. In 1887 the company had ordered Bradley & Craven Ltd automatic brick presses, which were fabricated by Langlands foundry and a year later purchased another at the centennial exhibition. The first kiln was circular, but the company rapidly expanded and added at least five oblong Hoffman Kilns between 1880 and about 1914.

In 1884 the company erected the new No 2 works in Dawson Street Brunswick, south of the original works, as the clay pit had been exhausted, having excavated up to the backs of nearby houses. This works employed over 400 men and produced over 40 million bricks per year, reflecting the importance of the industry on the landboom of the 1880s. After the depression of the 1890s, the company expanded throughout the following decades.  The Hoffmans factory whistle, which rang from 7:15 to 7:20 in the morning, to wake workers, was so regular that locals could set their watches by it.

The company also added a pottery works, much of the production going to terracotta sewage pipes as the Melbourne Sewage Scheme was being construction around the turn of the century. The pottery also manufactured a wide range of domestic wares including the Mel-rose Australian Ware

The Hoffman No 1 was used as a rubbish tip from 1947, taking 17 years to be filled completely. By 1981, it had settled sufficiently to be redeveloped by the local Council as a park, named the M.W. Clifton Reserve.

The Brunswick works was instrumental both in introducing new technology into the Australian brick industry, but also in restructuring the commercial basis, leading the move to takeovers and mergers and the creation of a brick cartel or combine, to set the price and production quotas for many competing brick companies.

In 1960 the Brunswick brickworks was taken over by Clifton Holdings, another brickmaker from St Georges Road Preston, which downsized operations and sold off assets at Brunswick and other brickworks, before it was itself taken over with Nubrick to form the Austral Brick Company. The works operated up to the late 1990s, but was sold to a developer on the basis that part of the site would be preserved and restored. The site has been partly redeveloped for apartments, but retains the brick press building which is in extremely poor condition  and was further damaged by fire in March 2018. In June 2020, the roof of the brick press building collapsed. This building was also proposed to be demolished by current owners. Two Hoffman Kilns, which have been converted by reconstruction of the upper levels for residences, and a third kiln chimney remain. Some of the adjacent pottery works buildings have also been converted for housing.

Hoffman's Dawson Street works is one of two surviving early Melbourne Brickworks, the other being the Box Hill brickworks. The site is listed on the Victorian Heritage Register.

References

 Miles Lewis, Australian Building, section 6 Bricks and Tiles: 6.01 Brick Making https://www.jstor.org/stable/40286853
 Iain Stuart, 'The History and Archaeology of the Hoffman Brick and Tile Company, Melbourne,Australia', Industrial Archaeology Review, XVII, 2 (Spring 1995), pp 130–1.

Industrial processes
Heritage sites in Melbourne
Heritage-listed buildings in Melbourne
Brickworks in Australia
Buildings and structures in the City of Merri-bek
1859 establishments in Australia
Buildings and structures completed in 1859